The 1916 Primera División was the fifth season of top-flight Peruvian football. Eight teams competed in the league. The champion was Sport José Gálvez.

League table

Standings

Title

External links
Sport José Gálvez bicampeón 1915-1916
Peruvian Championship
Peruvian Football League News 
La Liga Peruana de Football

Peru
1916
1916 in Peruvian football